Mestolobes quadrifasciata is a moth of the family Crambidae described by Otto Herman Swezey in 1920. It is endemic to the Hawaiian island of Oahu.

External links

Crambinae
Moths described in 1920
Endemic moths of Hawaii